In January 2003, Sushilkumar Shinde was sworn in as Chief Minister of Maharashtra, on resignation of his predecessor Vilasrao Deshmukh. Shinde led a cabinet consisting of his Congress party and alliance partner NCP, till the 2004 Maharashtra Legislative Assembly election. The Congress-NCP alliance secured a majority in those elections, but the Shinde ministry was replaced by his Deshmukh's second ministry.

Government formation
On his swearing in, Shinde was asked to prove majority support in the Legislative Assembly. Accordingly, on 22 January 2003, the Assembly passed a vote of confidence.

Ministry
The Shinde ministry initially consisted of 16 members, including Shinde. A week after his initial ministers were sworn in, Shinde inducted 53 new members (23 cabinet ministers and 30 ministers of state) and led a 68-member cabinet.

References

Indian National Congress
2003 in Indian politics
Maharashtra ministries
Nationalist Congress Party
Cabinets established in 2003
Cabinets disestablished in 2004
2003 establishments in Maharashtra
2004 disestablishments in India